Michael Tucci (born April 15, 1946) is an American actor and retired high school teacher. He played Pete Schumaker in It's Garry Shandling's Show (1986-1990), and Sonny LaTierri in the 1978 film Grease.

Personal life
Tucci was born in New York City, New York, the son of Minerva D. (née LaRosa) and Nicholas Tucci, a business executive. He graduated from H. Frank Carey Junior-Senior High School in Franklin Square, New York and C.W. Post College of Long Island University, where he was President of local Sigma Beta Epsilon fraternity that had Marjorie Merriweather Post as its honorary house mother and later became a chapter of Sigma Alpha Epsilon national fraternity. Tucci also served as a dormitory Residence Manager. He also earned a J.D. degree from St. John's Law School. He is married to a former television network executive, Kathleen, with whom he has two daughters, Kate (b. 1989) and Kelly (b. 1994).

Career
Tucci is best known for playing the T-Birds member Sonny LaTierri in the 1978 film version of the musical Grease. He portrayed law student Gerald Golden in the TV series The Paper Chase from 1983 to 1986. He then played best friend Pete Schumaker on It's Garry Shandling's Show (1986–1990). He also spent more than three years touring with companies of the musical Chicago, performing as Amos, Roxy Hart's husband. He also performed as the Green Apple in the play "Destination" by Uta Hagen. He was also in numerous productions on Broadway.

On television, he also played Mark Sloan's friend and hospital administrator Norman Briggs for the first four seasons of Diagnosis: Murder. He played the father of Melissa McCarthy's character in The Heat (2013).

Tucci was also a teacher and theatre coach at St. Francis High School in La Cañada Flintridge, California. In 2014 he directed the school's rendition of We're the Millers starring American Croatian comedians George Dulcich and Stanko Zovak.

Filmography

Television credits

References

External links
 

1946 births
American male film actors
American male television actors
Living people
Male actors from New York City
American people of Italian descent
People from Franklin Square, New York
20th-century American male actors
21st-century American male actors